Anthony Field at Wildcat Stadium is a stadium in Abilene, Texas. It is used as the home field of the Abilene Christian Wildcats football team. The stadium currently seats 12,000 people. The stadium's field is named after Abilene Christian University alumni, Mark and April Anthony, whose generous lead gift helped to fund the stadium.

History
Abilene Christian University, Hoar Construction and HKS Sports & Entertainment Group officially broke ground on February 19, 2016, to begin construction of the new stadium. Hoar Construction and HKS Sports & Entertainment Group were recognized by the Associated Builders and Contractors, Inc., 28th Annual Excellence in Construction Awards, for their work on the project. The stadium hosted its first home game on September 16, 2017, against the Houston Baptist Huskies.

Features
Wildcat Stadium features berm, club level and suite seating, a press box, event space for seating up to 500 people for non-gameday events, as well as a dedicated student section and an HD Video board in the north endzone.

See also
 List of NCAA Division I FCS football stadiums

References

External links
 Stadium website

College football venues
Abilene Christian Wildcats football
Sports venues in Abilene, Texas
American football venues in Texas
2017 establishments in Texas
Sports venues completed in 2017